Ramadan Shehu (born 14 July 1948) is an Albanian football coach and director, whose last role in football was as the technical director of Kukësi in the Albanian Superliga.

References

1948 births
Living people
Footballers from Tirana
Albanian footballers
Association football defenders
KF Vllaznia Shkodër players
Albanian football managers
Albanian sports coaches
FK Partizani Tirana managers
KF Tirana managers
Shkumbini Peqin managers
Besa Kavajë managers
KF Vllaznia Shkodër managers
Flamurtari Vlorë managers
KF Elbasani managers
KF Laçi managers
Kategoria Superiore managers